Waterloo 94 was a Canadian semi-professional ice hockey team in Waterloo, Quebec. They played in the Quebec Semi-Pro Hockey League for the 1996-1997 season. The club became the Granby Blitz for the 1997-98 season.

Records
Games Ghyslain Provencher, Martin Duval 34
Goals Martin Duval 24
Assists Ghyslain Provencher 35
Points Martin Duval 51
PIM Jimmy Dostie 95

External links
 The Internet Hockey Database

Ice hockey teams in Quebec
Waterloo, Quebec
Ice hockey clubs established in 1996
Sports clubs disestablished in 1997
Quebec Semi-Pro Hockey League teams
1996 establishments in Quebec
1997 disestablishments in Quebec